Franklin Thomas Grube (January 7, 1905 – July 2, 1945) was an American professional baseball and professional football player. In baseball, he was a catcher whose career lasted for 14 seasons (1928–1941), including 394 games in Major League Baseball as a member of the Chicago White Sox (1931–1933 and 1935–1936) and St. Louis Browns (1934–1935 and 1941). In football, he played left end for the New York football Yankees of the NFL, appearing in 11 games in 1928.

Grube was born in Easton, Pennsylvania, and attended Lafayette College in that city. In the majors, he collected 274 hits, including 59 doubles and one home run (struck off New York's Ivy Andrews at Yankee Stadium on September 12, in a rare tie game, called on account of darkness); he batted .244 with 107 runs batted in.

He was shot while visiting New York City, and died July 2, 1945, at Knickerbocker Hospital at age 40.

References

External links

 

1905 births
1945 deaths
American football wide receivers
Baltimore Orioles (IL) players
Baseball players from Pennsylvania
Bridgeport minor league baseball team players
Buffalo Bisons (minor league) players
Chicago White Sox players
Columbus Red Birds players
Dallas Steers players
Deaths by firearm in Manhattan
Jonesboro White Sox players
Lafayette Leopards baseball players
Lafayette Leopards football players
Major League Baseball catchers
Minor league baseball managers
New York Yankees (NFL) players
Firearm accident victims in the United States
Accidental deaths in New York (state)
Players of American football from Pennsylvania
Sacramento Solons players
St. Louis Browns players
San Antonio Missions players
Sportspeople from Easton, Pennsylvania
Toledo Mud Hens players
Williamsport Grays players